The following is a list of banks in Israel:

Central Bank

Major banks

Other banks

Postal Bank

Foreign banks

Credit card companies

See also
Banking in Israel
Economy of Israel

 
Israel
Banks
Israel